Hartshill Academy (formerly Hartshill School) is a mixed secondary school located in Hartshill area of Nuneaton in the English county of Warwickshire.

Feeder schools include Nathaniel Newton Infant School and Michael Drayton Junior School amongst others.

Established in 1957, the school converted to academy status in 2012 and is now sponsored by the Midland Academy Trust.

Hartshill Academy educates pupils from the Hartshill area of Nuneaton and surrounding areas. The school offers GCSEs and BTECs as programmes of study for pupils.

Naomi Smith went to school here.

References

External links
 

Secondary schools in Warwickshire
Educational institutions established in 1957
1957 establishments in England
Academies in Warwickshire